Darukan is a village in the central part of city functions Nikshahr in Iran's Sistan and Baluchistan Province. It is a village in the district Mhban based on the Census Bureau's Census 1385, it has a population of 1,500 people and 301 households.

Populated places in Sistan and Baluchestan Province